Kings Creek is a  long 4th order tributary to the Ohio River in Hancock County, West Virginia.

Variant names
According to the Geographic Names Information System, it has also been known historically as:
Indian Creek
South Fork

Course
Kings Creek rises about 2 miles south of Frankfort Springs, Pennsylvania, in Washington County and then flows generally west into West Virginia and Hancock County to join the Ohio River at Wiercrest.

Watershed
Kings Creek drains  of area, receives about 39.3 in/year of precipitation, has a wetness index of 319.56, and is about 71% forested.

See also
List of rivers of Pennsylvania
List of rivers of West Virginia

References

Rivers of West Virginia
Rivers of Pennsylvania
Rivers of Washington County, Pennsylvania
Rivers of Hancock County, West Virginia
Tributaries of the Ohio River